Xylosma parvifolia, commonly known as mountain xylosma, is a plant in the family Salicaceae.  It is endemic to the mountains of Australia's Lord Howe Island in the Tasman Sea.

Description
Mountain xylosma is a shrub that grows to 2 m in height.  Its leaves are rounded, 12 mm long by 8 mm wide, with toothed margins.  The fruits are globular, purple and 5 mm in diameter; they are eaten, and the seeds dispersed, by birds.

Distribution and habitat
The plant is largely restricted to low shrub vegetation growing on narrow, exposed, southeasterly or southwesterly ridges off the two mountains – Mounts Lidgbird and Gower – in the southern part of the island.  The known range lies within Lord Howe's Permanent Park Preserve.

Status and conservation
Fewer than 100 mature plants are known and, extrapolating to suitable habitat, fewer than 250 mature plants are likely to exist in the wild.  Because of its small population size, limited habitat and susceptibility to environmental and demographic stochasticity, the species is listed as Endangered under New South Wales’ Threatened Species Conservation Act 1995.

References

parvifolia
Endemic flora of Lord Howe Island
Plants described in 1984